All Saints College or All Saints' College may refer to:

Australia

New South Wales 
 All Saints' College, Bathurst
 Merged in 2019 to form Scots All Saints' College
 All Saints College, Maitland
 All Saints College, St Joseph's Campus, Lochinvar
 All Saints Catholic schools in Liverpool comprising:
 All Saints Catholic Senior College, Casula
 All Saints Catholic College, Liverpool

India
 All Saints College, Thiruvananthapuram, Kerala

Western Australia 
 All Saints' College, Perth

Sri Lanka
 All Saints College, Galle

United Kingdom
 All Saints College, Belfast, Northern Ireland
 All Saints Catholic College, Dukinfield, Greater Manchester, England
 All Saints Catholic College, Huddersfield, West Yorkshire, England
 All Saints Catholic College, North Kensington, London, England
 All Saints College, a former name of Leeds Trinity University

See also
 All Saints (disambiguation), includes other schools called All Saints
 All Saints Academy (disambiguation)
 All Saints School (disambiguation)
 All Saints University (disambiguation)